Clouston may refer to:

People
Clouston (surname)

Places
Clouston, West Virginia
Clouston Park, Upper Hutt, New Zealand

See also
Clouston's hidrotic ectodermal dysplasia